Felch Township is a civil township of Dickinson County in the U.S. state of Michigan, named in honor of Alpheus Felch.  The population was 752 at the 2010 census, slightly up from 726 at the 2000 census.

Communities
There are no incorporated municipalities in the township. 
Felch was a station on a branch of the Chicago and North Western Railway. A post office has been in operation there since 1906.
Metropolitan was a thriving village established just after 1880 to exploit the iron ore in the nearby Metropolitan Mine.  Metropolitan was about one mile west of Felch and was the last station on a branch of the Chicago and North Western Railway coming west from Escanaba. The village was platted by the Metropolitan Mining Company in 1881. A post office was in operation there from 1881 until 1963.  The present Zion Lutheran Church of Metropolitan sits almost exactly on the site of the old village, which is now a string of farms along the country roads. Metropolitan was sometimes referred to as Milltown and Farmertown.
It was platted for the Lake Superior Ship Canal, Railway &  Iron Company in 1881 by J.A. Van Clive.
Felch Mountain is an unincorporated community on M-69 about half a mile northwest of Felch. It is immediately adjacent to, and east of, Theodore.  Both Theodore and Felch Mountain are located on a steep hill north of M-69, while Felch and Metropolitan are located in the lower land south of M-69.
Spruce was a station on the Chicago and North Western Railway at  near the junction of Lucas Rd with M-69

Geography

Demographics
As of the census of 2000, there were 726 people, 274 households, and 204 families residing in the township.  The population density was 5.1 per square mile (2.0/km2).  There were 508 housing units at an average density of 3.6 per square mile (1.4/km2).  The racial makeup of the township was 98.21% White, 0.69% Native American, 0.14% Asian, 0.14% Pacific Islander, and 0.83% from two or more races. 32.1% were of Swedish, 14.1% German, 6.7% French, 6.5% Italian, 6.2% English and 6.2% Finnish ancestry according to Census 2000.

There were 274 households, out of which 36.1% had children under the age of 18 living with them, 66.4% were married couples living together, 3.6% had a female householder with no husband present, and 25.2% were non-families. 21.5% of all households were made up of individuals, and 8.8% had someone living alone who was 65 years of age or older.  The average household size was 2.65 and the average family size was 3.08.

In the township the population was spread out, with 26.2% under the age of 18, 7.6% from 18 to 24, 27.4% from 25 to 44, 24.2% from 45 to 64, and 14.6% who were 65 years of age or older.  The median age was 38 years. For every 100 females, there were 108.0 males.  For every 100 females age 18 and over, there were 108.6 males.

The median income for a household in the township was $36,667, and the median income for a family was $41,667. Males had a median income of $31,167 versus $18,958 for females. The per capita income for the township was $16,096.  About 3.5% of families and 8.1% of the population were below the poverty line, including 7.3% of those under age 18 and 12.2% of those age 65 or over.

The K-12 school in Felch is the North Dickinson School (replacing the old Felch High School). The school's nickname is the Nordics (from "NORth DICkinson").

The Felch Township web site is www.felchtownship.com

Notable residents
Chad Hord, professional off-road racing driver

References

Townships in Dickinson County, Michigan
Iron Mountain micropolitan area
Townships in Michigan